Gedko Powało was a thirteenth century bishop of Płock, Poland.

Born into the Ogończyk nobile family. He was made provost of the chapter of the Cathedral of Kraków in 1189 and in 1206 became bishop of Płock.

He is first attested in correspondence with Christian of Oliva the bishop of Chełmno, in Prussia, in a document dated 5 August 1222. Here he appears to be subordinate to the Prussian Bishopric. Płock appears to have been a base for missionary activity into Prussia at this time.

He is also recorded as approving the donation of the Pope Honorius III in the Bull Cum a nobis petitur in 1223.

The death of Gedko in 1223 left a power vacuum and the bishops throne remained vacant for two years as it was disputed between Jan Gozdawita and Gunter Prus. Both men eventually became Bishop.

References

Bishops of Płock
13th-century Polish nobility
Clan of Ogończyk
1223 deaths
13th-century Roman Catholic bishops in Poland
12th-century Polish nobility